Joseph Jones may refer to:
 Joseph Jones (basketball) (born 1986), American basketball player
 Joseph Jones (North Carolina politician), American 18th-century revolutionary
 Joseph Jones (rugby) (1899–1960), rugby union and rugby league footballer of the 1920s and 1930s
 Joseph Jones (trade unionist) (1891–1948), British coal miner
 Joseph Jones (Virginia politician) (1727–1805), U.S. statesman, delegate to the Continental Congress
 Joseph Jones (wrestler) (born 1957), American professional wrestler
 J. Charles Jones (1937–2019), American civil rights leader, attorney and co-founder of SNCC
 Joseph E. Jones (1914–2003), Wisconsin state legislator
 Joseph Jay Jones (1908–1999), professor of English at University of Texas
 Joseph Marion Jones (1908–1990), U.S. State Department official and academic
 Joseph Merrick Jones (1902–1963), American lawyer
 Joseph Jones (ironmaster) (1837–1912), industrialist and mayor of Wolverhampton
 Joseph David Jones (1827–1870), Welsh composer and schoolmaster
 Joseph David-Jones (born 1993), American actor
 Joseph Russell Jones (1823–1909), American merchant and politician
 Joseph Stevens Jones (1809–1877), Boston actor, playwright and theater manager
 Joseph T. Jones (1842–1916), American oil producer
 Joseph Vernon Jones, Wisconsin state legislator
 Joseph Jones (American football) (born 1994), linebacker
 Joseph Endom Jones (1850–1922), Baptist minister and professor
 Joseph R. Jones, researcher on bullying in educational environments
 Joseph Jones (footballer) (1880–?), English footballer

See also
 Joe Jones (disambiguation)
 Joey Jones (disambiguation)